On the night of 1 July 2016, at 21:20 local time, five militants took hostages and opened fire on the Holey Artisan Bakery in Gulshan Thana. The assailants entered the bakery with crude bombs, machetes, pistols, and took several dozen hostages (foreigners and locals). In the immediate response, while Dhaka Metropolitan Police tried to regain control of the bakery, two police officers were shot dead by the assailants.

29 people were killed, including 20 hostages (17 foreigners and 3 locals), two police officers, five gunmen, and two bakery staff. As the police were unsuccessful in breaching the bakery and securing the hostages, they set up a perimeter along with the Rapid Action Battalion and Border Guards Bangladesh. Very early on 2 July (around 03:00), it was decided that the Bangladesh Armed Forces would launch a counter assault named Operation Thunderbolt. The assault was led by the 1st Para-commando Battalion, an elite force in the Bangladesh Army, and began their raid at 07:40. According to Bangladesh's Inspector General of Police, all of the attackers were Bangladeshi citizens. Islamic State of Iraq and the Levant (ISIL) claimed responsibility for the incident and released photographs of the gunmen, but the home minister of Bangladesh, Asaduzzaman Khan, stated that the perpetrators belonged to Jamaat-ul-Mujahideen and were not affiliated with ISIL.

The incident was described by BBC as the "deadliest Islamist attack in Bangladeshi history." The local media described it as 7/16.

Background
Bangladesh, having a population of about 170 million, is a developing country with a GDP per capita income of $2,221 per year. The constitution of the country declares secularism as one of the four fundamental principles of the country but also recognizes Islam as the state religion. Around 89% of Bangladeshis are Muslims, with the rest being Hindus, Buddhists, Christians and others.

The militant Islamic organization Jamaat-ul-Mujahideen was founded in 1998 and outlawed in 2005 when it committed a series of bombings, but later took up activities again. Bangladesh government later tried and hanged Shaykh Abdur Rahman and Siddiqur Rahman, two leaders of the organization.

Some attacks came from another Islamic terrorist group outlawed in 2005 named Harkat-ul-Jihad al-Islami, including the 2004 Dhaka grenade attack and 2001 Ramna Batamul bombings. Mufti Hannan, the leader of the terrorist group was sentenced to death on 23 December 2008.

Since 2013, Muslim-majority Bangladesh has experienced an increase in Islamist attacks on religious minorities, secularist and atheist writers and bloggers, LGBT rights activists and liberal-minded Muslims. Since September 2015, there have been over 30 such attacks, and Islamic State of Iraq and the Levant claimed responsibility for 21 of them. Ansarullah Bangla Team, another terrorist group outlawed on 25 May 2015, also claimed responsibility for some of them.

In November 2015, the ISIL magazine Dabiq published an article calling for the "revival of jihad in Bengal".

Gulshan is a well off, upscale residential neighborhood of Dhaka and is home to many foreign embassies.

Attack and hostage

The attack started at about 21:40 local time. Five attackers entered the restaurant armed with bombs, pistols, and assault rifles. One attacker also had a sword. They opened fire indiscriminately and detonated several of the bombs. Several patrons dove under their tables, while panicked staff members ran onto the stairs. An Argentinian-Italian chef named Diego Rossini bolted upstairs, while several restaurant employees followed him. They then jumped onto the rooftops of nearby buildings.

Staff on the second floor ran and hid inside a restroom. A total of 8 staff members were hiding inside the restroom. The restroom was warm and cramped, as it was storing yeast and flour. The attackers then went upstairs and walked in front of the door, shouting "Bengali people, come out," "If you're Muslims, come out." Because there was no answer, the gunmen thought that there was no one inside the restroom, and locked the restroom's door. The staff members inside the restroom began to text their relatives, stating that they were inside the restroom and pleaded for help. The attackers then took many hostages, almost all foreigners. Reports indicate that the attackers were "unfailingly polite and solicitous" with the restaurant staff and other Bangladeshis. They took the staff into their confidence, complaining that foreigners, with their skimpy clothes and taste for alcohol, were impeding the spread of Islam. "Their lifestyle is encouraging local people to do the same thing," a militant said.

Alerted by the gunfire, police detective Rabiul Karim and officer-in-charge Salauddin Khan started to investigate. Other police officers responded, arriving at the restaurant. The attackers then engaged in a shootout with the police. Police cordoned off the area around the restaurant and planned a rescue raid. The attackers however threw grenades and fired, killing officers Karim and Khan.

DMP Commissioner, Asaduzzaman Mia, and several officers struck inside and opened fire on the militants in an attempt to rescue civilians from the site. 9 people were brought back from the site in the attempt. Prime Minister Sheikh Hasina was briefed by the Commissioner and she instructed him to move away with his men and informed him the Army Chief Belal Shafiul Huq was on his way from Sylhet.

The attackers then spotted one member of staff, named Miraj, who hid in the corner. One of the gunman told Miraj: "Everyone else ran away but you couldn't make it, that means God wants you to die." The gunman then strapped him to a chair with explosives, creating their human shield. The gunmen then separated the Muslims from the non-Muslims. The Muslims were given food and water, while the non-Muslims, were not. On the early morning of 2 July, the attackers began releasing hostages. A group of women wearing hijabs were released by the attackers; they offered a young Bangladeshi man, Faraaz Hossain, the opportunity to leave as well. However, Hossain refused their offer and refused to leave his friends, who were prohibited from leaving by the gunmen.

Pictures allegedly taken from inside the restaurant were circulated on Twitter by pro-ISIL accounts and show several bodies and pools of blood on the floor. The daily Kaler Kantho reported that the militant group Ansar al-Islam announced the upcoming attack via a tweet almost 10 hours before the actual attack took place.

Rescue operation

The rescue operation was ordered by the Bangladeshi Prime Minister Sheikh Hasina and was named Operation Thunderbolt. The planning of the Operation was finalized at a meeting between the Bangladeshi Prime Minister Sheikh Hasina and Armed forces chiefs and top officials of different law enforcement agencies. The operation was led by 1st Para-Commando Battalion under the leadership of Operational Commander Brig Gen Majibur Rahman of the Bangladesh Army's 46 Independent Infantry Brigade . Members of the Bangladesh Army, Navy, Air Force, Border Guard Bangladesh, Police, Rapid Action Battalion, and SWAT started the rescue operation at 07:40 local time. Commandos stormed into the bakery with nine APCs acting in support, smashing through the wall. A man, living next to the restaurant, took a video of the operation and tweeted it on internet. Within 12 to 13 minutes, they took control over the area. The rescue operation lasted around 50 minutes. Bangladesh Army chief General Abu Belal Muhammad Shafiul Huq and Bangladesh Navy chief Admiral Mohammad Nizamuddin Ahmed were present in the area during the raid.

Thirteen hostages were rescued. Five of the attackers were killed exchanging fire with the commandos, while the sixth was captured alive. During the operation one of the bakery's chefs was mistakenly identified as an attacker by the commandos and shot dead.

Two of the hostages, Tahmid Hasib Khan and Hasnat Karim, were taken by police for questioning, and subsequently vanished amidst confusion about whether they had been released or not.

Casualties
Twenty-two civilians, five terrorists, and two police officers were confirmed killed, while 50 others, mostly police personnel, were injured. The two dead police officers included Rabiul Islam, Assistant Commissioner of Detective Branch of the Dhaka Metropolitan Police, and Salahuddin Ahmed, officer-in-charge of the nearby Banani police station. Nine Italian citizens were among the victims. The Bangladesh Army initially announced that all 20 hostages killed in the attack were foreigners, and that they were "killed brutally with sharp weapons" by the perpetrators. Those who could recite a verse from the Quran from memory were spared in an effort to only kill non-Muslims. Later a chef of the bakery was identified among the dead bodies. An injured staff of the bakery died at Dhaka Medical College Hospital on 8 July 2016.

Among the dead were seven Japanese citizens – five men and two women – who were associated with the Japan International Cooperation Agency (JICA). One of the women was pregnant at the time. Tarishi Jain, a 19-year-old female student of the University of California, Berkeley, of Indian nationality, was also killed.

The dead included:

The five terrorists who died during rescue operation by military and joint forces are:

Among the injured were 25 police personnel. Among them were several higher-ranking officers of the Dhaka Metropolitan Police including an Additional Commissioner, two Additional Deputy Commissioners, the Officer-in-charge of the Gulshan police station and an Inspector.

The Italian Deputy Foreign Minister Mario Giro had attended a meeting in Bangladesh and visited the attack site. He then took the bodies of 9 Italian victims and carried them to their homeland in Italy. The plane carrying the bodies landed on 5 July at Ciampino Military Airbase south of Rome, Italy. Autopsy shows that all nine Italians were tortured in the attack. Several of them were slashed with knives and several of them were mutilated. Authorities confirmed that the nine Italian victims suffered "slow and agonizing death".

Relatives of the seven Japanese victims in the attack were flown to Bangladesh to view and identify the bodies, accompanied by Senior Vice Foreign Minister Seiji Kihara, Foreign Ministry and the Japan International Cooperation Agency. A ceremony for the repatriation of the bodies were held at a stadium in Dhaka, which was attended by the Japan's Ambassador to Bangladesh, Masato Watanabe. The bodies of the seven Japanese victims were flown to Tokyo on 5 July. The plane took off from Shahjalal International Airport at 8:40 pm local Bangladesh time.

Survivors recalled that the attackers had no mercy to the foreigners. One of the survivors stated that an Indian woman, identified as Tarishi Jain, who had been badly injured was moaning in agony but a perpetrator took a sword to her and killed her without mercy.

Responsibility
An initial report from Amaq News Agency, which is affiliated with the Islamic State of Iraq and the Levant, said the group claimed it had killed 24 people and wounded 40 others. A second report, issued directly by ISIL a few hours later, said the group had killed "22 crusaders" and was accompanied by photos of the attackers, standing in front of ISIL banners.

According to The New York Times, citing Bangladesh police, the attackers were named Akash, Badhon, Bikash, Don, and Ripon. ISIL referred to the five men by their kunya which were Abu Omar al-Bengali, Abu Salmah al-Bengali, Abu Rahim al-Bengali, Abu Muslim al-Bengali and Abu Muharib al-Bengali. According to The New York Times, pictures of the bodies of the five men, released by Bangladeshi police, matched five photographs of the men released by ISIL. 

Nevertheless, the home minister of Bangladesh, Asaduzzaman Khan, stated that the perpetrators belonged to Jamaat-ul-Mujahideen and were not affiliated with ISIL. They were well-educated and mostly from rich families. Bangladeshi politicians also blamed opposition groups, like those within the Bangladesh Nationalist Party, of plotting to destabilize the country by supporting Islamic extremists like the Jamaat-ul-Mujahideen. The opposition denied such claims. Bangladeshi Prime Minister Sheikh Hasina's political adviser Hossain Toufique Imam claimed that Bangladesh authorities who monitored social media saw several messages on Twitter on Friday (1 July 2016) saying there would be an attack; however, police believed that the attack would target embassies or major hotels and restaurants instead.

The attackers, all in their late teens or early 20s, were identified as wealthy men from Bangladesh's elite, having attended top private schools and universities in Bangladesh and abroad. It was revealed that three of the attackers came from a privileged background, educated with western curricula. Police named the five gunmen who attacked the restaurant as Nibras Islam, Rohan Imtiaz, Meer Saameh Mubasheer, Khairul Islam and Shafiqul Islam. One of them Nibras Islam was known as a "fun-loving, in and out of love, and keen on sport". He attended Monash University in Malaysia and returned because "he didn't like it in Monash". Nibras' father was a businessman with two houses in Dhaka, and one of his uncles was a Deputy Secretary to the Bangladesh Government. It was revealed that Nibras was following a Twitter account belonged to an Islamic State propagandist named Mehdi Masroor Biswas, who was arrested in Bangalore in 2015.

Two gunmen were identified as Meer Sameh Mubashir and Rohan Imtiaz. Both went to Scholastica School which follows Cambridge International Examinations curriculum. Local newspapers reported that both of them had gone missing long before the attack. Rohan Imtiaz has been identified as the son of a politician in Bangladesh's ruling party Awami League. Police then identified another gunman, named as Shafiqul Islam Ujjal from Koiyagarhi village, Bogra District. He enrolled at Government Azizul Haque College in Bogra for graduation after passing higher secondary examinations. He had left the college later and took up a teaching job at a kindergarten school in Shajahan Market area in Dhaka.

On 6 July 2016, a video was released by IS from Syria through SITE intelligence website, where three Bengali speakers warned the Bangladeshi Government saying "What you witnessed in Bangladesh...was a glimpse. This will repeat, repeat and repeat until you lose and we win and the sharia is established throughout the world. The jihad that is waged today is a jihad under the shade of the Caliphate."

Suspects, arrests and convictions
On 16 July 2016, Police arrested three people for renting out a flat to the attackers in Bashundhara Residential Area. One of them was Gias Uddin Ahsan, a professor of North South University. The other two were his nephew Alam Chowdhury and the manager of the building Mahbubur Rahman Tuhin. Police found sand-filled cartons, which police suspect to be used to carry grenades thrown during the attack and used clothes in the flat. Police also suspect that the attackers and their associates stayed in the flat during Ramadan, and the attack plan was drafted there.

On 26 July 2016, police raided an apartment in Kallyanpur, killing nine and tly assisted byarresting two, all of whom are believed to be part of the same group that carried out the Holey Artisan Bakery attack, and who were planning another attack. It is reported that the police were directing vigilantes organized as a "citizen's committee" by the local MP for Dhaka-14, Aslamul Haque. Participants included members of the Awami League, Jubo League, and Chhatra League.

On 27 August 2016, Tamim Chowdhury, the supposed mastermind of the attack, was killed in a raid on an IS safehouse in Dhaka by Bangladeshi forces. On 2 September his deputy Murad was killed in another raid in Dhaka's Rupnagar area.

On 6 January 2017, Bangladeshi police shot dead two Islamist militants including Nurul Islam Marjan, a commander of a splinter group of the Jamaat-ul-Mujahideen Bangladesh (JMB) which is the prime suspect and was on a police wanted list for his role in the attack since July 2016.

On the night of 13 January 2017, Bangladeshi counterterrorism forces arrested Jahangir Alam, man suspected of being a key planner of the attack in Tangail District.

In December 2018, the trial of eight people accused of being Jamaat-ul-Mujahideen Bangladesh who were suspected of helping plan and supply weapons for the attack opened before a special tribunal in Dhaka. In November 2019 seven were convicted and sentenced to death while one was acquitted.

Zakir Naik and Peace TV
After revealing the investigations of the attack in July 2016 published by The Daily Star that a terrorist involved in the brutal killings followed Zakir Naik's page on Facebook and was influenced by Naik's speeches, The terrorist had posted sermons of Zakir Naik on social media where Naik urged "all Muslims to be terrorists" Indian Union Minister of State for Home Affairs Kiren Rijiju said, "Zakir Naik's speech is a matter of concern for us. Our agencies are working on this." He was then termed a controversial as well as a popular figure by the media. After 2 days in investigation, the Maharashtra State Intelligence Department (SID) gave a clean chit to Zakir Naik and said that Naik would not and cannot be arrested on his return to India as the probe ordered by the Maharashtra government did not find any other strong evidence to link Naik to terror-related activities. The Daily Star apologized to Naik over the Dhaka Terror Attack controversy and stated that they never blamed him for the attack. The newspaper quoted that it only reported how youth were misinterpreting his speeches. However, soon thereafter the Bangladesh Government banned the broadcast of Naik's Peace TV channel. Hasanul Haq Inu, the Information Minister, reasoned that "Peace TV is not consistent with Muslim society, the Quran, sunnah, hadith, Bangladesh's constitution, our culture, customs and rituals".

Reactions
  Bangladeshi Prime Minister Sheikh Hasina condemned the killings and hostage crisis and stated that Islamic terrorists were maligning the name of Islam and assured that the government will do everything to restrain militancy and extremism in the country. President Abdul Hamid also condemned the terrorist attack and expressed deep shock at the death of the hostages and police officials. Two days of national mourning was observed in the memory of the deceased victims.
  The Brazilian envoy to Bangladesh, Wanja Campos da Nóbrega termed the café attack a "cowardly act" and expressed condolences for the victims. She added that the Brazilian Government condemns vehemently this violent act and supports Bangladesh in its fight against terrorism.
  The High Commissioner of Canada in Dhaka, Benoît-Pierre Laramée, released a statement, saying that "Canada stands with Bangladesh in face of this act of terror".
  The Danish Minister of Foreign Affairs Kristian Jensen released a statement: "Such meaningless violence is completely unacceptable and must be fought. Our strongest response is to stay united and not let our democracy, liberty and way of live fall into fear and despair". The Danish authorities were in close contact with the security over their citizens in Dhaka.
  The French Foreign Ministry in a statement said "Terrorism is a global scourge. France is determined to strengthen international cooperation to combat terrorism everywhere".
  German Foreign Minister Frank-Walter Steinmeier said in a statement: "Once more conscienceless terrorists struck with sheer brutality and forced numerous human beings to die with them. I condemn this horrid attack in the strongest possible terms. We mourn the victims and share the grief of their relatives. In these sad hours, my thoughts are with the people in Bangladesh as well as with our Italian, Japanese and Indian friends and all those affected by this gruesome attack."
  Indian Prime Minister Narendra Modi condemned the attack and said, "the attack in Dhaka has pained us beyond words." He also telephoned his Bangladeshi counterpart. President Pranab Mukherjee wrote on Twitter that he was "deeply saddened at the loss of life and injuries caused to innocent civilians."
  Iranian Foreign Ministry spokesman Bahram Qasemi condemned terrorist attacks in Dhaka and expressed condolence with Bangladesh., he later added: "The terrorist move proves that terrorism has no boundaries jeopardizing the international peace and security regardless of nationality, religion and geographical location requiring collective contribution. This inhuman carnage is very painful and all should come together to seriously thwart the threats posed by terrorism to the international community"
  Italian Prime Minister Matteo Renzi offered condolences to the families of the victims, saying, "our values are stronger than hatred and terror." He also said that the nation had suffered "a painful loss." The Italy national football team wore black armbands during their Euro quarter final match against Germany. Both teams held a moment of silence in memory of the victims before the game.
  Japanese Prime Minister Shinzo Abe telephoned his Bangladeshi counterpart and commanded the Embassy of Japan in Bangladesh to rescue the Japanese alive from the crisis, labeling the incident as "unfortunate". Some other Japanese government officials and agencies including Foreign Minister Fumio Kishida, Deputy Chief Cabinet Secretary Koichi Hagiuda, Chief Cabinet Secretary Yoshihide Suga, Japan International Cooperation Agency expressed their concern over the incident and condemned the killings.
  Emir of Kuwait, Sabah Al-Ahmad Al-Jaber Al-Sabah sent a cable to President of Bangladesh, expressing sorrow over the attack and called the attack as "heinous".
  Malaysian Prime Minister Najib Razak condemned the attack and said this is "a clarion call" for the world to unite against the scourge of terrorism. He urged every governments in the world to "analyse every shred of information" and share them across all intelligence agencies
  The Philippines on 7 July condemned "in the strongest terms" the attack on a popular tourist café in Bangladesh that killed 20 foreigners on 1 July. "The Philippines expresses its solidarity with the Government and people of Bangladesh and extends sincere condolences to the victims' families," the DFA said in a statement. The DFA described the siege in Dhaka as a "serious atrocity committed against peace-loving nations and peoples."
  The Russian Ministry of Foreign Affairs released a statement which read: "we are indignant at this yet another inhumane terrorist attack, which has no justification. We express our sincere condolences to the relatives of those killed and wish the injured quickest recovery.What happened in Dhaka once again proves that it is necessary to immediately combine efforts of all the global community to fight international terrorism."
  Singapore's Ministry of Foreign Affairs condemned the attack in its strongest terms. It stated: "There can be no justifications for such heinous actions. We express our deepest condolences to the bereaved families and wish the injured a speedy recovery".
  Ambassador of Switzerland to Dhaka Christian Fotsch condemned the attack. He stated that "The people of Bangladesh are admired for their hospitality extended to foreigners and for preserving their tolerant and secular heritage – values which Switzerland shares very much. Appropriate measures are to be taken to prevent the spread of violent extremism and to bring the perpetrators of the attacks to justice."
  British Prime Minister David Cameron conveyed to his Bangladeshi counterpart that "as a close friend of Bangladesh, the UK is committed to working with you, and stand ready to discuss any assistance that the UK may be able to provide. I also share the pain of the people of Bangladesh at this difficult time. Nothing can justify such an attack on innocent people going about their daily lives." The British High Commission in Dhaka termed the attack as a "senseless act of terror" and stated that "We should do all that we can to strengthen our resolve to proclaim Islam as a religion of peace and to reject those who seek to justify violence in its name."
  U.S. President Barack Obama and Secretary of State John Kerry offered condolences to the victims and reiterated their support for Bangladesh in its commitment against religious militancy. President Obama was briefed during the 12-hour siege. Numerous members of the U. S. Congress also condemned the attacks, expressed solidarity with Bangladeshis and other involved nationalities; and called for a strong response against the perpetrators.

Organizations
  EU Chief of Foreign Policy Federica Mogherini issued a statement expressing 'solidarity' with Bangladesh. The statement said that the EU stands with the people of Bangladesh and offered their deepest condolences to the dead and to the wounded.
  The Organisation of Islamic Cooperation, as shocked to hear the attack and condemned the attack in its strongest terms, and offered their condolences to the victims of the attack.
  The United Nations Security Council strongly condemned the terrorist attack and said, "the members of the Security Council reaffirmed that terrorism in all its forms and manifestations constitutes one of the most serious threats to international peace and security".

In popular culture
 2019 Bangladeshi-German-Russian co-production film Shonibar Bikel and 2022 Indian film Faraaz are based on the event.

See also
 2014 Sydney hostage crisis
 List of hostage crises

References

External links

 Panoramic images of the bakery on Google Maps

Attacks on bakeries
Islamic terrorist incidents in 2016
ISIL terrorist incidents in Bangladesh
July 2016 crimes in Asia
Mass murder in 2016
Murder in Bangladesh
Massacres in 2016
Massacres in Bangladesh
Terrorist incidents in Bangladesh in 2016
Hostage taking in Bangladesh
Crime in Dhaka
Terrorism in Bangladesh
2010s in Dhaka
Attacks on tourists
Italian people murdered abroad
Indian people murdered abroad